Lifecycle is the 17th studio album by the American jazz group Yellowjackets featuring Mike Stern, released in 2008. The album reached a peak position of number six on Billboard Top Jazz Albums chart.

Track listing

Personnel 

Yellowjackets
 Russell Ferrante – acoustic piano, keyboards, percussion 
 Jimmy Haslip – electric bass, programming (10), sequencing (10)
 Marcus Baylor – drums, percussion 
 Bob Mintzer – tenor saxophone, soprano saxophone, bass clarinet, Bb clarinet, EWI

Special Guest
 Mike Stern – guitars

Production 
 Yellowjackets – producers
 Dave Love – executive producer 
 Rich Breen – engineer, mixing, mastering 
 Daryl Bornstein – assistant engineer
 Hal Winer – assistant engineer, technician 
 Michael Bishop – mastering 
 Jerry Mitkowski – technician
 Mike Sciotto – technician
 Margi Tobey – video editor
 Natalie Singer – product manager
 Margi Denton – graphic design 
 KVON – photography

Management 
 Megan Ehrlich, Jeff Neben and Gerry Puhara at Axis Artist Management, Inc.
 Roy Holland – management for Mike Stern.

Studios 
 Recorded at BiCostal Music (Ossining, NY).
 Mixed and Mastered at Dogmatic Studios (Burbank, CA).

Charts

References

2008 albums
Yellowjackets albums